Paul Frederick Terbenche (September 16, 1945 — January 8, 2012) was a Canadian professional ice hockey defenceman.  He played in the National Hockey League with the Chicago Black Hawks and Buffalo Sabres from 1967 to 1974, as well as in the World Hockey Association with the Vancouver Blazers, Calgary Cowboys, Birmingham Bulls, Houston Aeros, and Winnipeg Jets from 1974 to 1979.

During his NHL career, Terbenche appeared in 189 games, scoring five goals and adding twenty-six assists. A free agent in 1974, Terbenche was selected by the Kansas City Scouts in the NHL expansion draft but chose instead to sign with WHA's Vancouver franchise. He played in 277 WHA games, scoring eighteen goals and adding sixty-four assists.

Career statistics

Regular season and playoffs

External links
 

1945 births
2012 deaths
Birmingham Bulls (CHL) players
Birmingham Bulls players
Buffalo Sabres players
Calgary Cowboys players
Canadian ice hockey defencemen
Chicago Blackhawks players
Dallas Black Hawks players
Hampton Gulls (AHL) players
Houston Aeros (WHA) players
Ice hockey people from Ontario
People from Northumberland County, Ontario
Portland Buckaroos players
Salt Lake Golden Eagles (WHL) players
Springfield Indians players
St. Catharines Black Hawks players
Winnipeg Jets (WHA) players
Vancouver Blazers players